Two on the Steppes is a 1964 Soviet drama film directed by Anatoly Efros.

Plot 
The film takes place in the summer of 1942, when on the Don the Soviet army tries to repel the German fascists. In the center of the plot is a young lieutenant Ogarkov, who is sent to the division by order of redeployment. He wanders all night in the steppe and cannot cope with the task, for which he must be shot. Convoy Dzhurabaeva leads him to be shot across the steppe, but they gradually become friends.

Cast 
 Valeri Babyatinsky as Ogarkov (as V. Baryatinsky)
 Assu Nurekenov
 V. Batalova
 Svetlana Konovalova
 Evgeniya Presnikova
 Konstantin Khudyakov
 Ivan Kuznetsov
 Dmitriy Masanov
 Anatoliy Verbitskiy

References

External links 
 

1964 films
1960s Russian-language films
Soviet drama films
1964 drama films